Smile Records is Los Angeles based powerpop independent record label founded in 1995 by  musician-producer Tony Valenziano and Tansy Alexander.  In 2001 Smile entered a distribution contract with  video and DVD distributor Image Entertainment who wanted to enter the audio market.

Roster
 The Knack
 Wondermints
 Carla Olson
 The Negro Problem
 Hutch
 Supremium
 The Stand
 Stew
 The Andersons
 Smash
 Sparkle*jets u.k.
 The Oranges

References

External links

American record labels
Pop record labels
Rock record labels
Record labels established in 1995
Companies based in Los Angeles